Charles Morris Anderson (born 1957) is a landscape architect and fellow of the American Society of Landscape Architects, He is a Principal of the Phoenix-based landscape architecture firm, Charles Anderson Landscape Architecture, which is the continuation of his practice of the Seattle-based firm Charles Anderson Landscape Architecture.

Anderson is recognized by the American Society of Landscape Architects for combining nature, community needs, and art into his designs, emphasizing sustainability, indigenous plants and urban ecology.

Influences
Anderson's influences and contemporaries include Peter Walker, affiliated with the team involved in the World Trade Center Memorial project; Richard Haag, famous for his Gas Works Park project in Seattle; and Cornelia Oberlander, a Canadian landscape architect renown for the creative use of native plants on landmark projects like the Museum of Anthropology, Vancouver, BC.

Anderson also had special interest in the work of Robert Smithson, an influential artist of the 1960s and 1970s, James Turrell, a contemporary artist who focuses on light and space, and Julie Bargmann, who focuses on regenerative landscapes.

Charles Anderson
Charles Anderson, FASLA is a Principal and Director of Urban Design/Landscape Architecture at Cuningham. A feature project in his portfolio is The Ellinikon Project in Athens Greece. This is one of the largest projects in Europe and Includes Metropolitan Park of 500 acres, 200 acres of additional open space and a mile of coastline. Projects are national and international projects as well, including, Haiti  and Vietnam.

Other notable projects by Charles Anderson include providing landscape design for the Anchorage Museum expansion, as well as Seattle's  Olympic Sculpture Park, Mount St. Helens National Volcanic Monument, and Manhattan's Arthur Ross Terrace.

Some neighborhood park projects include the Roxhill Wetland and Bog Park in West Seattle and the restoration of the 500 Area of Discovery Park, both of which received Merit Awards from the Washington Chapter of the American Society of Landscape Architects.

Recognition
The American Society of Landscape Architects (ASLA) awarded Anderson for his designs in the Tables of Water in Lake Washington (Washington State), the Mount Saint Helens National Volcanic Monument project, the Trillium Projects in Seattle, and the Arthur Ross Terrace  design in Manhattan, New York and the Olympic Sculpture Park (4), Seattle, WA.

The Washington State Chapter of American Society of Landscape Architects inducted Anderson into the Council of Fellows in 2006.

Emo Urbanism (Big Nature)
Anderson has defined his emerging design theory as “Emo Urbanism.” It is differentiated from other conceptual processes with a focus on art, culture, ecology, and the fourth dimension. He emphasizes authentic landscape—habitat and complete ecosystems—within an ordered human environment. His work on the Olympic Sculpture Park in Seattle, WA is an example of this with its paradigm shift in nature/human interaction. Anderson's stroke introduced entropic organization along Seattle's Elliott Bay. His intervention created a native ecosystem responsive to flora, fauna, and the hard lines of existing infrastructure. Anderson made vital the natural processes that sustain a dynamic, human centered world.

The quality produced through Emo Urbanism is paramount to the tangible connection of person to place. Anderson has described this connection as the “thinness.” It is the simultaneous perception and implicit understanding of the past, present, and future. Excellent design will achieve this in a manner that is simple, immediate, and direct. Anderson believes that its traditional counterpart, “context,” is often just a justification to make a designer's brand fit the site. Within Emo Urbanism, the brand is created from the thinness. The result can embrace or contrast the physical manifestation of place, but it must always produce a unique fingerprint.

Current urbanism is pushing park space and outdoor amenity space to the rooftops in most densely developed cities. Big Nature is the principal approach to a project that carries sustainable, indigenous focused landscapes to the rooftops in cities. Not as a purist notion but instead as a counterpoint to the contemporary view of urban landscape. With these landscape will come the creatures that identify these landscapes as home.

The critical theory of Emo Urbanism was the basis for a seminar of the same name at the Arizona State University in 2012 and 2013.

Urbanature
Anderson defines the practice of Emo Urbanism as “urbanature.” In practice, he differentiates between the wilderness and wildness. Henry David Thoreau held that “in wildness is the preservation of the world.” Urbanature implements wildness—the authentic landscape—within the urban environment. Urbanature demonstrates that nature does not exist solely in an untouched wilderness. Ashton Nichols, a professor of English Language and Literature at Dickinson College, first developed the term in relation to ecocriticism and how people perceive the world around them.  He states that “the interconnectedness demanded by urbanature insists that human beings are not out of nature when they stand in the streets of Manahattan any more than they are in nature when they stand in the mountain above tree-line in Montana." Urbanature provides the tangible benefits of nature in an environment not traditionally thought of as appropriate. A clear example can be seen in Project Phoenix, an in progress soccer stadium in Haiti. Here Charles has composed a landscape entirely of edibles and a lake containing tilapia for consumption. Composting and recycling facilities are also integrated. Anderson contends that the landscape cannot just be an aesthetic tool, it must also provide for the mental, physical, and social health of people regardless of where they live.

Anderson's award-winning urbanature includes the Alaska Museum of History and Art, the Olympic Sculpture Park, and Trillium Projects and can be seen throughout his monograph, “Wandering Ecologies.”

References

External links
 
 
 
 
 http://design.asu.edu/events/lectures_archive.php
 https://www.google.com/search?rlz=1C1GGGE_enUS469US469&sourceid=chrome&ie=UTF-8&q=emo+urbanism
 https://web.archive.org/web/20140811090550/http://www.monolab.nl/en/projects.php?p=residential&id=75

1957 births
Living people
Date of birth missing (living people)
American landscape architects
Harvard Graduate School of Design alumni
Washington State University alumni